Kimberly Joines (born January 27, 1981 in Edmonton) is a Canadian alpine skier. While snowboarding in the year 2000 Kimberly was involved in a snowboarding accident. The accident resulted in spinal cord injuries at the L1/T12 vertebra and consequently she is paralysed from the waist down. She subsequently joined the Canadian para-Alpine ski team. She competed in the 2010 Vancouver Paralympics in five events: Downhill (women’s sitting), Super G (Women’s sitting), Super combined (Women’s sitting), Giant Slalom (Women’s sitting) and Slalom (Women’s sitting).

Joines won a bronze medal at the Torino Paralympic games in 2006. She was suspended in 2007 after being tested positive for marijuana. She also competed in wheelchair basketball at the 2004 Paralympic Games in Athens.

She won Bronze in the Women's slalom, sitting at the 2014 Winter Paralympics.

References

External sources
 Kimberly Joines's Official Website
 Canadian Paralympic Association

Living people
Canadian female alpine skiers
Alpine skiers at the 2006 Winter Paralympics
Paralympic alpine skiers of Canada
1981 births
Medalists at the 2014 Winter Paralympics
Medalists at the 2006 Winter Paralympics
Paralympic medalists in alpine skiing
Paralympic bronze medalists for Canada
21st-century Canadian women